The Abenaki Formation is a geologic formation in Nova Scotia. It preserves fossils dating back to the Cretaceous period.

See also

 List of fossiliferous stratigraphic units in Nova Scotia

References
 

Cretaceous Nova Scotia